Pristimantis walkeri is a species of frog in the family Strabomantidae.
It is endemic to Ecuador.
Its natural habitats are tropical dry forests, moist lowland forests, moist montane forests, plantations, rural gardens, and heavily degraded former forest.
It is threatened by habitat loss.

References

walkeri
Amphibians of Ecuador
Endemic fauna of Ecuador
Amphibians described in 1974
Taxonomy articles created by Polbot